Carlos Aurelio López Rubio (born 21 March 1991) is a Mexican professional footballer who plays for Juventud Antoniana.

Honours
Cafetaleros de Tapachula
Ascenso MX: Clausura 2018

Mexico U20
CONCACAF U-20 Championship: 2011
FIFA U-20 World Cup 3rd Place: 2011

References

External links
 
 Carlos Aurelio López at BDFA

1991 births
Living people
Mexican footballers
Mexican expatriate footballers
Association football goalkeepers
Sportspeople from León, Guanajuato
Footballers from Guanajuato
Talleres de Córdoba footballers
Club América footballers
Atlético Morelia players
Santos de Guápiles footballers
Dorados de Sinaloa footballers
Cafetaleros de Chiapas footballers
Club Real Potosí players
Club Atlético Mitre footballers
Juventud Antoniana footballers
Ascenso MX players
Liga Premier de México players
Tercera División de México players
Liga FPD players
Mexican expatriate sportspeople in Costa Rica
Mexican expatriate sportspeople in Argentina
Expatriate footballers in Costa Rica
Expatriate footballers in Bolivia
Expatriate footballers in Argentina